The Breasts of Tiresias is a surrealist play by Guillaume Apollinaire. Written in 1903, the play received its first production in a revised version subtitled Drame surréaliste in 1917. With this subtitle and in the preface to the play, the poet invented the word "surrealism" to describe his new style of drama.

The play has been adapted into an opera by Francis Poulenc.  It also has been translated twice, first by Louis Simpson in the 1960s and then by Maya Slater in 2009.  In 2010, Eric "Wally" Wallach adapted and directed The Breasts of Tiresias: A Surrealist Musical in Paris.

Plot
Inspired by the story of the Theban soothsayer Teiresias, the author inverted the myth to produce a provocative interpretation with feminist and pacifist elements. He tells the story of Thérèse, who changes her sex to obtain power among men, with the aim of changing customs, subverting the past, and establishing equality between the sexes.

References

Sources
 Banham, Martin, ed. 1998. The Cambridge Guide to Theatre. Cambridge: Cambridge UP. .
 Brockett, Oscar G. and Franklin J. Hildy. 2003. History of the Theatre. Ninth edition, International edition. Boston: Allyn and Bacon. .

External links 
 Les Mamelles de Tirésias (full text in French)

1917 plays
Surrealist plays
Works by Guillaume Apollinaire